Afghanistan competed at the 1968 Summer Olympics in Mexico City.

They fielded five wrestlers, all men.

Competitors
The following is the list of number of competitors in the Games.

Wrestling

Men's freestyle

References
Official Olympic Reports
Part Three: Results

Nations at the 1968 Summer Olympics
1968
1968 in Afghan sport